Michael John Fles (born 11 November 1936), known both as John Fles and Michael Fles, is an American poet, editor, musician and film personality. Professor David James referred to him as "the single most important promoter of underground film" in Los Angeles.

Biography
Michael John Fles was born to a Dutch father, George Fles, and a British mother, Pearl Rimel. As conscious communists, his parents had moved to the Soviet Union, where his father fell victim to Joseph Stalin's Great Purge. The mother, pregnant with Michael John, had left the Soviet Union to give birth in London. Mother and son later emigrated to the United States, where Pearl Rimel found employment in the aircraft industry. Michael John grew up in Los Angeles and Ojai, California, where he graduated from the Ojai Valley School in 1950.

Beat poet and editor
Fles studied philosophy at the University of Chicago, but did not graduate. While a student, he became the managing editor of the Chicago Review. In 1959 Fles was involved in the founding of the influential literary magazine Big Table. Later he was the editor of The Trembling Lamb, a one shot literary magazine that published Antonin Artaud's "Van Gogh: The Man Suicided by Society", LeRoi Jones's "The System of Dante's Inferno", and Carl Solomon's "Danish Impasse". In 1960 and 1961 he was a managing and contributing editor of Kulchur. During all these years he published his poetry far and wide.

Film personality and musician
In October 1963 he founded the Movies Round Midnight program at the Cinema Theatre at 1122 N. Western Ave. in Los Angeles, along with Mike Getz. He ran the program until 1965. From 1962 and into the 1980s he wrote over a dozen movie scripts, usually with co-authors.

Since, Fles has been active as a musician and music therapist, in the US, Canada, Mexico, and Israel. He lives in Trinidad, California and is now retired.

Bibliography

Poetry
 1957 – Arrow-less Alleys (Three Penny Press)
 1957 – Beat and Beatific (Three Penny Press), with Gene Maslow
 1958 – Testament (Three Penny Press)
 1959 – Lawrence Lies Crucified (Three Penny Press)
 1964 – Doon Glyn, Summer 1963 (self-published)

Fiction
 1958 – The Man Who Lived Underground (unpublished screenplay), with John Evans after a story by Richard Wright

Nonfiction
 1960 – "The End of the Affair, or Beyond the Beat Generation", Village Voice 6 (8) (15 Dec): 4, 12.
 1960 – "The Root", Kulchur 1960 (Spring): 39–41
 1961 – "The Great Chicago Poetry Reading", Swank 8 (1) (March) 65–68, 70.
 1961 – "Uncle Bill Burroughs' Guided Tour: Naked Lunch", Swank 8 (3) (July): 50.
 1963 – "Personal State Meant" ("written and read at the Cinema T[heater] on May 9, 1963"), published as chapter 5 in James, David, and Hyman, Adam (eds.): Alternative Projections: Experimental Film in Los Angeles, 1945-1980, Indiana University Press, 2015, pp 41–42.
 1963 – "Are Movies Junk?", Film Culture 29, republished as chapter 7 in James, David, and Hyman, Adam (eds.): Alternative Projections: Experimental Film in Los Angeles, 1945-1980, Indiana University Press, 2015, pp 45–46.
 1964 – Seeing is Believing (self-published), republished as chapter 9 in James, David, and Hyman, Adam (eds.): Alternative Projections: Experimental Film in Los Angeles, 1945-1980, Indiana University Press, 2015, pp 53–56.
 1995 – "Sound Wave Mirror", chapter 11 in Kenny CB (editor): Listening, Playing, Creating: Essays on the Power of Sound. Albany, New York: State University of New York Press.

References

External links
 Michael John Fles, 1959 photos at Getty Images 
 Sahaja, 2014 musical video produced by Shody Ryon
 2017 interview of Michael Fles

1936 births
Living people
Film people from Los Angeles
American magazine editors
American modernist poets
American non-fiction writers
American people of Dutch-Jewish descent
Beat Generation poets
Beat Generation writers
English emigrants to the United States
Jewish American musicians
Jewish American poets
Music therapists
Musicians from London
Musicians from Los Angeles
People from Ojai, California
People from Trinidad, California
University of Chicago alumni
Writers from London
Writers from Los Angeles
20th-century American poets
20th-century American musicians
21st-century American musicians
21st-century American Jews